Aldo Cibic (born 1955 in Schio, Vicenza, Italy) is an Italian designer.

Career

By the age of 22, Aldo was working at the studio of Ettore Sottsass.  In 1980, he became a founding partner of the studio Sottsass & Associati. That same year, in collaboration with Sottsass, Cibic became a founding member of Memphis Group – a collective association dedicated to design and architecture. The Memphis group would remain active until 1987. The Memphis experience led Cibic to assume an experimental approach as his norm.

Decisive the relationship with Ettore Sottsass, who chose him as a partner when Aldo was in his twenties, and in his last interview declares: “I do not think I have left any traces of my work, maybe something in Aldo Cibic” .

Towards the end of the 1980s, Aldo began to reflect on a more personal concept of creativity, which inspired the launch of his first independent project. In line with his idea of a more human, less heroic form of design, he choose not only to design objects for the home, but also to sell them, He presented his first self-produced collection, entitled “Standard”, to the public from his loft home in Milan, inaugurating a tradition of impromptu exhibitions, which have since become a means of testing his design projects and continue to guide his research.

His research activity in the field of "social innovation design" has developed through teaching in various schools of Design and Architecture (Domus Academy Milan, Politecnico Milan, IUAV Venice, Tongji University Shanghai). Starting with Family Business, in "The Solid Side" initiative, launched in collaboration with Philips Corporate Design at the Domus Academy in the early 1990s, has produced pioneering projects, such as New Stories New Design (2002), and CitizenCity (2003). These research projects fostered a dynamic relationship between people and space and offered a new mode of designing places based on social interactions, revolving around a central theme: the interpretation of sustainability.  An experience culminating with the "Microrealities" project presented at the Biennale di Venezia in 2004.

For the 12th edition of Biennale di Venezia in 2010, 43 artists were invited by Kazuyo Sejima, including Aldo Cibic to propose a project called "Rethinking happiness" aimed at creating and enhancing happiness in new communities through 4 unique projects. Aldo Cibic invited architects, agronomists, designers, sociologists and energy consultants for the projects.

In 2015, he curated the Venice Pavilion at the 56th International Art Exhibition Biennale of Venice, exploring the declinations of the creative process between globalization and territorial roots.

In 2019 Aldo Cibic has been selected as High-End Foreign Expert by the State Administration of Foreign Experts Affairs of People's Republic of China.

Aldo Cibic is Honorary Professor at the Tongji University, Shanghai.

In 2021 he has been appointed Honorary Professor of Urban Studies at the Shanghai Academy of Social Sciences.

His design pieces and drawings are exhibited in the permanent collections of the Stedelijk Museum in Amsterdam, the Groninger Museum, the CCA (Canadian Center for Architecture) in Montreal, the Victoria and Albert Museum in London, the Triennale Museum of Italian Design in Milan and the Centre Pompidou in Paris.

Aldo Cibic has been included by the architecture magazine Domus in the guide to the world's best architects “100+ best architecture firms 2019”. Inter alia, Domus editors Alessandro Mendini and Joseph Grima put forward a selection in favour of giving a voice to practices that show how “it may be possible for social architecture to really bloom in the future”.

Cibic Workshop
Using investigative research into design, Cibic Workshop observes the built environment from a different perspective and on a different scale. The individual becomes the central focus, along with his/her complex system of relationships, his/her ability to imagine and invent, to discover new opportunities and to take advantage of change.

Cibic Workshop focuses on alternative sustainable project types aimed at enhancing whole local areas and defining new cultural, emotional and environmental awareness of public space.

In 2020 Cibic Workshop opened a new office in Shanghai, with a focus on creating meaningful and culturally relevant objects, spaces and communities, both public and private, through addressing the issues we see as most important to society today.

Key Areas of work:

 Accessible beauty for domestic spaces
 Communal Landscapes creating a sense of community and responsibility for shared spaces and environments
 The New Old, new design from old materials

Selected projects

Architecture 
Savona 18 Hotel, Milan 2017    
Techno Souq, La Rinascente, Milan 2015    
Excelsior Milano: Luxury Department Store, Verona 2013
Ristori Theatre: Restoration, Verona 2012
Staff International: New Headquarters, Noventa Vicentina 2010 
More with Less. Enjoy life in a changing world: Superstudio 13, Salone del Mobile, Milan 2009 
Living Nature: Project for a sustainable resort community, Shanghai, China 2008 
Danguyan: Masterplan for eco-village development, Kunshan, China 2008 
Nordhavnen, the sustainable city of the future: International Competition, Copenaghen 2008 
Risanamento - Santa Giulia: Redevelopment Project for the offices and commercial areas of a NH Hotel, Milan 2008
Private Villa: Barolo region, Piemonte 2008
Enzo Ferrari's birthplace and the Maserati Museum: International Competition, 2007
10th International Exhibition of Architecture: Art Direction and Exhibition Design, Venice 2006
La Rinascente: Department Store, Redesign of the building in Piazza Duomo, Milan 2006 
Positec China: Corporate Headquarters and Production Facility, Suzhou, China 2006
Dalla Verde: New office building, Montecchio Maggiore, Verona 2004
Autogrill: Architectural design of Restaurants and Drive-thru points, Italy 2001

Exhibition Design 
Pietro Bembo and the invention of the Renaissance: Exhibition, Padua, 2013
Cultivating a house: Exhibition, MADE Expo 2012
Genova Today, Genova Tomorrow: Exhibition, Loggia di Banchi, Genoa 2011
1906-2015: Towards Milan Expo: Exhibition, Triennale di Milano, Milan 2011 
Woodwork, Design exhibition in collaboration with Studio Mumbai, Salone del Mobile 2012
Pocket Landscapes: Drawings and installations by Aldo Cibic, Galleria Antonia Jannone, Salone del Mobile 2009 
The Garden City: Saie Spring, Bologna 2008
Istanbul Design Week 2008: Concept and Art Direction, Istanbul, project, 2008
Andrea Palladio 500: Art Direction of the exhibition inaugurated in celebration of the 500th anniversary of the birth of Andrea Palladio (1508-2008), Vicenza, 2007 
10th Biennale of Architecture: Art Direction, Exhibition Design, Venice 2006 
New Stories New Design: 6th Shanghai Biennale, Shanghai 2006
Farming-on-Thames: London Architecture Biennale, London 2006 
A Perfect Weekend: Exhibition: Cibic&Partners Studio, Milan, 2005 
Andrea Palladio e la villa veneta. Da Petrarca a Carlo Scarpa: Exhibition design, Museo Palladio di Palazzo Barbaran da Porto, Vicenza 2005 
M City: Museum Kunsthaus Graz, Graz 2005–2006 
Microrealities: Biennale di Venezia, Venice 2004 
New Stories New Design: Biennale di Venezia, Italian pavilion, Venice 2004
Citizen_City: Exhibition, Milan 2003 
Telecom: Pavilion, World Telecommunications Expo, Geneva 1999 
Pitti Ynformal: Multimedia Lighting and Sound Stand, Pitti Immagine, Florence 1999 
Pirelli: Stand, Motor show, Bologna 1996

Interior Design 
Ca’puccino, Harrods, London 2015    
Glam Hotel, Milan 2015    
Arc'terix: Corner shop, Verona 2013
Marc Jacobs, Showroom, Milan 2013
Staff International: Showroom, Milan 2013
La Rinascente: Department Store, Milan 2010
Marazzi: Headquarters, Modena 2006 
Selfridges & Co.: Department Store, Birmingham 2004 
Mövenpick: Restaurants, Hannover, Berlin and Lucern 2004 
Abitare: New Headquarters 2003
Selfridges & Co.: Department Store, Manchester 2002 
I.Net British Telecom: New Headquarters, Milan 2001
Geox: Design for a chain of boutiques, 2000
Green House Vicenza: Private Villa, Arcugnano 1999
Verona Airport: Departures Area and VIP Lounge, Verona, 1997
Habitat: Shops, London, 1997
House in Venezia: Private Apartment, Venice 1992

Design 
Venini Glasses: Lou Collection, 2017    
Marble Landscape - Blumohito, 2017    
Ghidini: Bio & Trio, lamps, 2017    
Italian Landscape, bone China for Expo 2015    
Green Dunes- Blumohito, Dubai's Downtown Design, 2015
Wish tree and Lucky Eye – Blackbody, lighting, 2014    
Elephountain, installation, 2013    
Bormioli Rocco: InAlto Glasses Collection, 2013
Woodwork: Wooden Object Collection, in collaboration with Studio Mumbai, 2012
Moret: Happy carpets, Carpet collection, 2012
UNA: Design of wine bottles for the 150th anniversary of the unification of Italy, 2011
Riva 1920: Table, “Frammenti di Wabi-Sabi”, Le Briccole Collection, 2010
De Castelli: Art Direction and Design, 2009-2010
Millepiedi: Bench, Giardini della Triennale, Milan, 2005
Artemide: Klik lamp, 2002 
Foscarini: Cocò lamp, 2000 and Lampoon lamp, 2002 
Cappellini: Stool, 2002 
Paola C.: Art Direction and Design, since 2000
Standard: A range of furniture and accessories for interior decoration, 1991 
Memphis: Furniture and Objects, 1981-1987

Design Research 
Looking ahead. The evolution of the art of making. 9 stories from Veneto: digital – not only digital, Venice Pavilion, 56th Biennale Venezia, 2015
Freedom Room: Triennale di Milano, Milan 2013
Toward Expo Milano 2015, Milan, 2011
Rethinking Happiness: Biennale di Venezia, Venice, 2010
Perché Design?: CibicWorkshop Project 2006 
A Perfect Weekend: Design Research and Exhibition, Cibic & Partners Studio, Milan 2005
Microrealities: Biennale di Architettura, Venice 2004 
New Stories New Design: Biennale di Architettura, Venice 2004 
Citizen_city: Design Research, Milan 2003 
Smart Home Fitness: Design Research, Milan 1998
Family Business: The Solid Side, Domus Academy, Milan 1984

Publications 
 Aldo Cibic (editor), Looking ahead. The evolution of the art of making. 9 stories from Veneto: digital – not only digital, Marsilio, Venezia, 2015 
 Cibicworkshop, COMODO, Freedom Room, Vicenza, 2013
 AAVV, Verso Expo Milano 2015, Electa, Milano, 2011, 
 Aldo Cibic, Rethinking Happiness -Do unto others as you would have them do unto you. New realities for changing lifestyles, Corraini Edizioni, Mantova, 2010, 
 Chen Yong Qun Deng Aldo Cibic Italian designer,Tongji University Press, 2009
 AAVV, Progetti & Paesaggi, Mondadori, Milano, 2008
 Aldo Cibic e Cibic&Partners, Microrealities A project about places and people, Skira, Milano, 2006 
 Burigana, M. Ciampi, Italian Designers at Home,  Verbavolant, Londra, 2006, 
 Frida Doveil, Aldo Cibic, Abitare Segesta, Milano, 2005 
 Cibic & Partners, Aldo Cibic e Erin Sharp, Citizen City, Milano 2003
 AAVV, Aldo Cibic Designer, Skira, Milano, 1999, 
 Aldo Cibic e Xavier Moulin, Smart Home Fitness, I.D.S. Editions, Milano, 1998, 
 Aldo Cibic e Erin Sharp, Family Business, in Ezio Manzini e Marco Susani (a cura di), The Solid Side, V+K Publishing, Naarden, Olanda, 1995
 AAVV, Sottsass Associati, Rizzoli International Publications, Inc. New York 1988 (ed. It. L’Archivolto, Milano, 1989)
 Barbara Radice, Memphis. Ricerche, esperienze, risultati, fallimenti e successi del Nuovo Design, Electa, Milano 1984 
 Barbara Radice(editor), Memphis. The new international style, Electa, Milano 1981

References

External links
Cibicworkshop Official website
Finding aid for the Aldo Cibic Microrealities Project collection, Canadian Centre for Architecture

Italian designers
1955 births
Living people
People from Schio